Karan or Karran or Korran or Keran, also rendered as Kiran, may refer to:
 Karan-e Bozorg, Khalkhal, Ardabil Province
 Karan-e Bozorg, Nir, Ardabil Province
 Korran, Kerman
 Karan, Chaharmahal and Bakhtiari
 Karan, Razavi Khorasan
 Karan, West Azerbaijan
 Karan-e Olya, West Azerbaijan Province
 Karan-e Sofla, West Azerbaijan Province
 Karan-e Vasat, West Azerbaijan Province